"Voodoo Cowboy" is a song by the Danish dance-pop duo Infernal. It was released as the fourth single from their debut album, Infernal Affairs, in 1998.

Track listings

Credits and personnel
Music and lyrics written by Infernal and Peter Beim
All tracks produced, mixed and arranged by Infernal and E.T.A.
Mastered by Michael Pfundheller
Executive producer: Kenneth Bager
"Voodoo Cowboy" (Aliens Ate My C-C-Countryclub Mix): additional remix and production by Kjeld Tolstrup and N. Steen

Charts

References

1998 singles
Infernal (Danish band) songs
1998 songs